List of Members of the 3rd Lok Sabha, (2 April 1962 – 3 March 1967) elected February–March 1962. The Lok Sabha (House of the People) is the lower house in the Parliament of India. The election was held for 494 seats out of which Indian national congress won 361 seats. 14 sitting members from Rajya Sabha were elected to 3rd Lok Sabha after the 1962 Indian general election.
 
Jawaharlal Nehru was Prime Minister as in 1st Lok Sabha and 2nd Lok Sabha, till his death on 27 May 1964.
Gulzarilal Nanda became acting Prime Minister for 13 days, before Lal Bahadur Shastri became Prime Minister on 9 June 1964. After Shastri's death on 11 January 1966, Nanda became acting Prime Minister again for 13 days. Later Indira Gandhi, Rajya Sabha member from Uttar Pradesh became Prime Minister on 24 January 1966.

The next 4th Lok Sabha was constituted on 4 March 1967 after 1967 Indian general election.

Important members
 Speaker:
Sardar Hukam Singh from 17 April 1962 to 16 March 1967
 Deputy Speaker :
S. V. Krishnamoorthy Rao from 23 April 1962 to 3 March 1967
 Secretary General:
M. N. Kaul from 27 July 1947 to 1 September 1964
S. L. Shakdhar from 2 September 1964 to 18 June 1977

List of members by political party

Members of the political party in the 3rd Lok Sabha are given below

References

External links

 Terms of the Lok Sabha
India MPs 1962–1967
1962 establishments in India
1967 disestablishments in India